Joshua MacDonald (born 20 January 1997) is a speedway rider from Australia.

Speedway career 
He guested during the same season for the King's Lynn Stars in the highest division of UK speedway. In 2021, he was due to ride for Poole Pirates but switched to Scunthorpe Scorpions instead.

In 2022, MacDonald signed for the Oxford Cheetahs for the 2022 season. The Cheetahs were returning to action after a 14-year absence from British Speedway.

References 

1997 births
Living people
Australian speedway riders
Oxford Cheetahs riders
Scunthorpe Scorpions riders
Sheffield Tigers riders
People from the Hunter Region
Sportsmen from New South Wales